Stutterheim Hospital is a Provincial government funded hospital in the Amahlathi Local Municipality area in Stutterheim, Eastern Cape in South Africa.

The hospital departments include Emergency department, Paediatric ward, Maternity ward, Out Patients Department, Surgical Services, Medical Services, Operating Theatre & CSSD Services, Pharmacy, Anti-Retroviral (ARV) treatment for HIV/AIDS, Post Trauma Counseling Services, X-ray Services, Physiotherapy, Laundry Services, Kitchen Services and Mortuary.

References 
 Stutterheim Hospital

Hospitals in the Eastern Cape
Amathole District Municipality